Kansas State Department Board of Education (KSDE) is Kansas's Board of Education, headquartered in Topeka. The board of education that controls the department is a constitutional body established in Article 6 of the Kansas Constitution. The ten members of the Board of Education are each elected to four-year terms. The Board helps determine educational policy for the state's primary and secondary schools.

The Kansas State Board of Education was created to replace the position of Kansas State Superintendent of Public Instruction effective January 14, 1969, pursuant to an amendment to the Kansas Constitution adopted November 8, 1966.

Intelligent design controversy

There has been a controversy regarding the status of creationism and evolution in the Kansas public education system.

In 1999, the Board ruled that instruction about evolution, the age of the earth, and the origin of the universe was permitted, but not mandatory, and that those topics would not appear on state standardized tests. The board relied heavily on Creation Science Association of Mid America material in constructing science standards that minimized the tuition of evolution. However, the Board reversed this decision February 14, 2001, ruling that instruction of all those topics was mandatory and that they would appear on standardized tests.

Then on August 9, 2005, the Board approved a draft of science curriculum standards that mandated equal time for the theories of "evolution" and "intelligent design". But on February 13, 2007, the Board voted 6 to 4 to reject the amended science standards enacted in 2005. The definition of science was once again limited to "the search for natural explanations for what is observed in the universe", or what is known as "methodological naturalism".

See also
 Creation and evolution in public education
 State education agency

References

Further reading
 Kester, D., & Kester, J. (1985). History of the Kansas State Department of Education. Topeka, KS: Kansas Department of Education.
 Throckmorton, A.F. (1967). Kansas Educational Progress: 1858-1967. Topeka, KS: Kansas State Department of Public Instruction.
 Throckmorton, Adel F. (1960). Our Kansas System of Education. Topeka, KS: Kansas State Department of Public Instruction.
 Yudhijit Bhattacharjee, Strategies Evolve as Candidates Prepare for Kansas Board Races. Science 3 February 2006 311: 588-589 DOI 10.1126/science.311.5761.588
 Yudhijit Bhattarcharjee, Evolution Trumps Intelligent Design in Kansas Vote. Science 11 August 2006 313: 743 DOI 10.1126/science.313.5788.743
 AAAS Board of Directors, On the Kansas State Board of Education Decision on the Education of Students in the Science of Evolution and Cosmology. Science 12 November 1999 286: 1297 DOI 10.1126/science.286.5443.1297b

External links
KSDE
 
 Kansas School District Boundary Map, KSDE
KGI Online Library
 Kansas State Board of Education Meeting Minutes (1968-present)
 Kansas Educational Directory (1941-present)
 Kansas Education Accountability Report (2000/01-present)
 Other KSDE publications at KGI Online Library

Controversy
 Kansas education board downplays evolution State school board OKs standards casting doubt on Darwin.
 Kansas Rewrites Science Standards Again
 Letters to the Kansas State Board of Education regarding evolution and science curriculum standards, June 7, 2005
 Kansas board of education scraps standards questioning evolution 

 
1969 establishments in Kansas